East Middle Sweden is a National Area of Sweden. The National Areas are a part of the NUTS statistical regions of Sweden.

Geography
The region is situated in the central part of the Sweden, close to the county and the metropolitan area of Stockholm. It borders with the riksområden of North Middle Sweden, West Sweden, Småland and the islands and Stockholm (National Area).

The most populous cities are Uppsala, Västerås, Örebro, Linköping, Norrköping, Eskilstuna, Nyköping, Motala, Enköping and Katrineholm.

Subdivision
East Middle Sweden includes 5 counties: 
 Örebro (seat: Örebro)
 Östergötland (seat: Linköping)
 Södermanland (seat: Nyköping)
 Uppsala (seat: Uppsala)
 Västmanland (seat: Västerås)

Economy 
The Gross domestic product (GDP) of the region was 76.258 billion € in 2021, accounting for 14.5% of Swedish economic output. GDP per capita adjusted for purchasing power was 31,500 € or 106% of the EU27 average in the same year. The GDP per employee was also 106% of the EU average.

See also 
Svealand
Riksområden
NUTS of Sweden
ISO 3166-2:SE
Local administrative unit
Subdivisions of Norden

References

External links

 
National Areas of Sweden
Svealand
NUTS 2 statistical regions of the European Union